Over 140 species of butterfly that are found in the south-eastern Australian state of Victoria. This list includes native and introduced species and subspecies.

Papilionidae

family: Papilionidae (swallowtails) — 4 species
 genus: Graphium
 Macleay's swallowtail, Graphium macleayanus
 genus: Papilio
Orchard swallowtail, Papilio aegeus
Dainty swallowtail, Papilio anactus
Chequered swallowtail, Papilio demoleus

Pieridae

family: Pieridae (whites and yellows) — 12 + 1 species [1 introduced species]
 genus: Appias
 Yellow albatross, Appias paulina
 genus: Belenois
 Belenois java
 genus: Catopsilia
 Yellow migrant, Catopsilia gorgophone
 Lemon migrant, Catopsilia pomona
 White migrant, Catopsilia pyranthe
 genus: Cepora
 Caper gull, Cepora perimale
 genus: Delias
 Delias aganippe
 Imperial Jezebel, Delias harpalyce
 Black Jezebel, Delias nigrina
 Yellow-spotted Jezebel, Delias nysa
 genus: Elodina
 Narrow-winged pearl-white, Elodina padusa
 genus: Eurema
 Small grass-yellow, Eurema smilax
 genus: Pieris
 Small white, Pieris rapae

Lycaenidae

family: Lycaenidae (gossamer-winged blues and coppers) — 39 species
 genus: Acrodipsas
 Acrodipsas aurata
 Bronze ant-blue, Acrodipsas brisbanensis
 Copper ant-blue, Acrodipsas cuprea
 Small ant-blue, Acrodipsas myrmecophila
 genus: Candalides
 Common pencilled-blue, Candalides absimilis
 Blotched dusky-blue, Candalides acasta
 Dark pencilled-blue, Candalides consimilis
 Copper pencilled-blue, Candalides cyprotus
 Rayed blue, Candalides heathi
C. h. alpina
C. h. heathi
 Varied dusky-blue, Candalides hyacinthina
C. h. hyacinthina
C. h. josephina
C. h. simplexa
 Yellow-spotted blue, Candalides xanthospilos
 genus: Hypochrysops
 Yellow jewel, Hypochrysops byzos
 Moonlight jewel, Hypochrysops delicia
 Fiery jewel, Hypochrysops ignita
 genus: Jalmenus
 Imperial hairstreak, Jalmenus evagoras
 Amethyst hairstreak, Jalmenus icilius
 Stencilled hairstreak, Jalmenus ictinus
 genus: Lampides
 Long-tailed pea-blue, Lampides boeticus
 genus: Lucia
 Grassland copper, Lucia limbaria
 genus: Nacaduba
 Two-spotted line-blue, Nacaduba biocellata
 genus: Neolucia
 Fringed heath-blue, Neolucia agricola
 Montane heath-blue, Neolucia hobartensis
 Broom heath-blue, Neolucia mathewi
 genus: Ogyris
 Dark-purple azure, Ogyris abrota
 Satin azure, Ogyris amaryllis
 Southern purple azure, Ogyris genoveva
O. g. araxes
O. g. duaringa
 Large bronze azure, Ogyris idmo
 Dull-purple azure, Ogyris olane
 Small bronze azure, Ogyris otanes
 Arid bronze azure, Ogyris subterrestris
 genus: Paralucia
 Bright copper, Paralucia aurifer
 Dull copper, Paralucia pyrodiscus
 genus: Pseudalmenus
 Silky hairstreak, Pseudalmenus chlorinda
P. c. fisheri
P. c. zephyrus
 genus: Theclinesthes
 Bitter-bush blue, Theclinesthes albocincta
 Wattle blue, Theclinesthes miskini
 Salt-bush blue, Theclinesthes serpentata
 Saltpan blue, Theclinesthes sulpitius
 genus: Zizeeria
 Spotted grass-blue, Zizeeria karsandra
 Common grass-blue, Zizina labradus

Nymphalidae
family: Nymphalidae (brush– or four-footed) — 28 species
 genus: Acraea
 Glasswing, Acraea andromacha
 genus: Argynnina
 Argynnina cyrila
 genus: Danaus
 Lesser wanderer, Danaus chrysippus
 Monarch butterfly, Danaus plexippus
 genus: Euploea
 Common crow, Euploea core
 genus: Geitoneura
 Ringed xenica, Geitoneura acantha
 Marbled xenica, Geitoneura klugii

 genus: Heteronympha
 Heteronympha banksii
H. b. banksii
H. b. nevina
 Bright-eyed brown, Heteronympha cordace
H. c. cordace
H. c. wilsoni
 Common brown, Heteronympha merope
 Wonder brown, Heteronympha mirifica
 Spotted brown, Heteronympha paradelpha
 Shouldered brown, Heteronympha penelope
H. p. alope
H. p. maraia
H. p. sterope
 Solander's brown, Heteronympha solandri
H. s. angela
H. s. solandri

 genus: Hypocysta
 Rock ringlet, Hypocysta euphemia
 genus: Hypolimnas
 Varied eggfly, Hypolimnas bolina
 genus: Junonia
 Meadow argus, Junonia villida
 genus: Oreixenica
 Orange alpine xenica, Oreixenica correae
 Striped xenica, Oreixenica kershawi
O. k. kanunda
O. k. kershawi
 Silver xenica, Oreixenica lathoniella
 Small alpine xenica, Oreixenica latialis
O. l. latialis
O. l. theddora
 Spotted alpine xenica, Oreixenica orichora
 genus: Polyura
 Tailed emperor, Polyura sempronius
 genus: Tirumala
 Tirumala hamata

 genus: Tisiphone
 Tisiphone abeona
T. a. albifascia
T. a. antoni
 genus: Vanessa
 Yellow admiral, Vanessa itea
 Australian painted lady, Vanessa kershawi
 genus: Ypthima
 Dusky knight, Ypthima arctous

Hesperiidae
family: Hesperiidae (skippers) — 40 species
 genus: Anisynta
 Mottled grass-skipper, Anisynta cynone
 Two-brand grass-skipper, Anisynta dominula
 Montane grass-skipper, Anisynta monticolae
 genus: Antipodia
 Antipodia atralba
 Antipodia chaostola
 genus: Badamia

 Narrow-winged awl, Badamia exclamationis
 genus: Cephrenes
 Orange palm dart, Cephrenes augiades
 Yellow palm dart, Cephrenes trichopepla
 genus: Dispar
 Barred skipper, Dispar compacta
 genus: Hesperilla
 Hesperilla chrysotricha
H. c. cyclospila
H. c. leucosia
 Hesperilla crypsargyra
 Hesperilla donnysa
H. d. delos
H. d. patmos
 Hesperilla flavescens
 Hesperilla idothea
H. i. clara
H. i. idothea n
 Hesperilla mastersi
 Hesperilla ornata
 Hesperilla picta
 genus: Mesodina
 Mesodina halyzia
 Motasingha trimaculata
 genus: Netrocoryne
 Netrocoryne repanda
 genus: Oreisplanus

 Green grass-dart, Ocybadistes walkeri
 Oreisplanus munionga
 Oreisplanus perornata
 genus: Pasma
 Pasma tasmanicus
 genus: Signeta
 Signeta flammeata
 genus: Suniana

 Suniana lascivia
 genus: Taractrocera
 Taractrocera papyria
 genus: Anisynta
 Sedge darter, Telicota eurotas
 genus: Toxidia
 Toxidia andersoni
 Toxidia doubledayi
 Toxidia parvulus
 Toxidia peron
 genus: Trapezites
 Orange ochre, Trapezites eliena
 Silver-studded ochre, Trapezites iacchoides
 Yellow ochre, Trapezites lutea
 Heath ochre, Trapezites phigalia
 Montane ochre, Trapezites phigalioides
 Southern silver ochre, Trapezites praxedes
 Trapezites sciron
 Splendid ochre, Trapezites symmomus
T. s. soma
T. s. symmomus

See also
 List of butterflies of Australia
 List of butterflies of Tasmania

References
 Museum Victoria, Bioinformatics

'butterflies
°Victoria
Victoria
Victoria
butterflies of Victoria
butterflies